Varamdeh (also Romanized as Varāmdeh, Varām Deh, and Vāram Deh; also known as Varāndeh) is a village in Bala Khiyaban-e Litkuh Rural District, in the Central District of Amol County, Mazandaran Province, Iran. At the 2006 census, its population was 418, in 107 families.

References 

Populated places in Amol County